Gigi Fernández and Natasha Zvereva were the defending champions, and successfully defended their title, defeating Larisa Savchenko and Jana Novotná in the final 6–3, 7–5.

Seeds

Draw

Finals

Top half

Section 1

Section 2

Bottom half

Section 3

Section 4

References
1993 French Open – Women's draws and results at the International Tennis Federation

Women's Doubles
French Open by year – Women's doubles
1993 in women's tennis
1993 in French women's sport